Hurricane Debbie was a moderate tropical cyclone which had significant impacts in Ireland as an extratropical cyclone. The fourth named storm of the 1961 Atlantic hurricane season, Debbie originated from a well-defined tropical disturbance that was first identified in late August over Central Africa. Tracking generally westward, the system moved off the coast of Senegal on September 5 into the Atlantic Ocean. By this time, it was estimated to have become a tropical depression, but forecasters did not issue advisories on the system until two days later. Late on September 6, Debbie passed through the southern Cape Verde Islands as a moderate tropical storm. Once clear of the islands, data on the storm became sparse, and the status of Debbie was uncertain over the following several days as it tracked west-northwestward and later northward. It was not until a commercial airliner intercepted the storm on September 10 that its location became certain. The following day, Debbie intensified and reached its peak intensity as a Category 1 hurricane on the Saffir–Simpson hurricane scale, with maximum winds of 90 mph (150 km/h).

Maintaining its peak intensity for almost a day, the hurricane gradually slowed its forward motion and weakened. By September 13, Debbie's motion became increasingly influenced by the Westerlies, causing the system to accelerate east-northeastwards. The system passed over the western Azores as an extratropical cyclone bearing hurricane-force winds on September 15. The system subsequently deepened explosively as it neared Ireland, skirting the coast of western Ireland (perhaps briefly making landfall near Connemara) from mid-morning onwards on September 16, before rushing northwards towards the Outer Hebrides of Scotland that evening. The peaks of the winds over Ireland occurred during the morning and early afternoon on a Saturday (market day) when many people were outdoors doing their shopping. The remnants of the storm later weakened and turned eastwards, striking Norway and the Soviet Union, before dissipating on September 19.

Striking Ireland as an extremely powerful mid-latitude storm, the remnants of Debbie brought record winds to large parts of the island, with a maximum wind gust of 98kn (113 mph) at the Met Éireann meteorological station of Malin Head (county Donegal), an absolute Irish station record that still stands today, and which equals the strongest wind gust recorded at a land-based lowland site in the Republic of Ireland. New data uncovered by Graham and Smart (2021) also shows that the same station recorded a possible new Irish mean (10min) windspeed record of 76kn (87 mph) during four unique consecutive hours of Hurricane Force 12 winds on the Beaufort Scale that day. These winds caused widespread damage and disruption, downing tens of thousands of trees and power lines. Countless structures sustained varying degrees of damage, with many smaller buildings destroyed. Agriculture experienced extensive losses to barley, corn and wheat crops. Debbie killed 18 people – 12 in the Republic of Ireland and six in Northern Ireland. It caused US$40–50 million in damage in the Republic and at least £1.5 million (US$4 million) in Northern Ireland.

Meteorological history

During late August and into early September 1961, an unusual series of low-level disturbances developed over Central and West Africa and into the eastern Atlantic Ocean. One of these systems, that probably formed over Central Africa at the end of August, became increasingly organized as it moved over Nigeria on September 1. As the disturbance travelled steadily westward, its mid-level circulation became well defined, and the accompanying low-level centre gradually followed suit. An upper-level anticyclone accompanied the storm during this entire period, providing a favorable upper-air regime for strengthening. According to a post-storm study in 1962, all the necessary environmental ingredients were available to the disturbance while it was over land; the only factor inhibiting earlier development was a lack of access to the warm waters. Around 12:00 UTC on September 5, the low emerged off the coast of Senegal as a strong tropical depression. By this time, the system had a central pressure below 1006 mbar (hPa; 29.71 inHg), and sustained winds of 35 mph (55 km/h) were reported in Bissau, Guinea-Bissau. As the system neared Cape Verde, it continued to intensify; early on September 7, reports from the nearby Danish tanker Charlotte Maersk indicated that the system was already at or near hurricane intensity.

Late on September 6, Debbie passed over the southern Cape Verde Islands as a strong tropical storm or low-end hurricane. Continuing on a west-northwest path, mainly in response to a large area of high pressure over the eastern Atlantic, the system continued to intensify. Sea surface temperatures in the region averaged , supportive of tropical development. Over the following three days, virtually no data was available on the hurricane and no reliable estimates on its intensity could be made. During this time, the storm was estimated to have taken a more north-westerly course over the open ocean. It was not until a KLM flight encountered the storm on September 10 that an accurate positioning of the hurricane could be made.

After maintaining a nearly steady course for three days, Hurricane Debbie turned northward and slowed as it neared a break in the ridge previously steering it west-northwestward. During the evening of September 11, a United States Navy Aircraft reconnaissance mission into the storm estimated sustained winds of 110 – 120 mph (175 – 195 km/h) and a central pressure of 976 mbar (hPa; 28.82 inHg); based on these data, reanalysis in 2019 concluded that Debbie peaked as a modern-day Category 1 hurricane on the Saffir–Simpson hurricane scale with winds of 90 mph (150 km/h). After maintaining its winds for over 18 hours, the system weakened and turned sharply towards the east-northeast in response to the upper-level westerlies. By the afternoon of September 13, Debbie quickly accelerated towards the Azores. Early on September 15, the storm acquired extratropical characteristics and passed over the western Azores with winds estimated at 80 mph (130 km/h) before turning more northeasterly. While the Weather Bureau's preliminary report noted that Debbie acquired characteristics of an extratropical cyclone on September 15, until 2019 the system was still classified as a hurricane at that time and listed as such until its final position was noted. Prior to reanalysis, the best track supplied by the Bureau and the National Hurricane Center's hurricane database maintained the system as a tropical cyclone until the afternoon of September 16, when the system was last observed.

The system moved towards Ireland and began to deepen. The remnants of Debbie eventually brushed the coast of Western Ireland near Achill Island during the morning of September 16 with sustained winds of 85 mph (140 km/h). Shortly after striking Ireland, the system was operationally confirmed to have transitioned into an extratropical cyclone as it re-emerged into the northeast Atlantic Ocean. After clearing Great Britain, the hurricane's remnants turned more easterly, later impacting Norway and the Soviet Union before dissipating on September 19.

Impact

Republic of Ireland

As early as September 13, residents were made aware that a storm might strike parts of Ireland with hurricane-force winds. Two days later, forecasters believed the storm would take a more southerly course towards France. This forecast was later withdrawn as the storm failed to turn eastward. Consequently, gale warnings were issued for much of western Ireland on the morning of September 16, hours before the brunt of the storm arrived. Fearing building collapses, officials in County Galway closed markets for the duration of the storm.

A powerful extratropical cyclone, on September 16 post-Debbie became one of the most intense storms on record to strike Ireland. At several locations, all-time wind gusts and ten-minute sustained wind records were broken. Post-Debbie was the strongest storm, in terms of atmospheric pressure, to strike Belmullet during the month of September, with a pressure of 961.4 mbar (hPa; 28.39 inHg) measured in Belmullet.

The greatest damage occurred in a swath stretching from Kerry to Limerick as well as the counties of Sligo and Donegal. In these areas, the storm's powerful winds damaged or destroyed many buildings and downed trees and power lines. In the hardest hit areas, communication was not restored for over four days. Many roads were blocked by debris for up to two days. Crops and trees were badly damaged. Approximately two percent of the trees in the forestry industry were snapped or uprooted. In general, corn and wheat crops fared better than expected, with only 25–30 percent being lost; however, some farmers reported barley losses greater than 50 percent. Downed trees from the storm wreaked havoc, leaving considerable damage and loss of life behind. All told, Hurricane Debbie was responsible for 12 deaths in the Republic of Ireland. Four people were killed in County Cavan – a widow, her two daughters and granddaughter – after a tree fell on their car. Five deaths resulted from fallen trees and three others were from building collapses. At least 50 people were injured, few of which were serious.

Newspapers reported that the city of Galway "resembled a bombed area," referring to the scale of damage caused by the winds. In nearby Ballygar, two barns were destroyed, one of which had debris strewn over a wide area. Hurricane-force winds battered Tuam for several hours, leaving most buildings damaged. Nearly every structure in Connemara was damaged and many homes lost their roofs. At Cork Airport, windows at the control tower were blown out and a construction crane was knocked over. Residents in Loughrea dubbed Saturday, September 16, 1961, as "The Day Of The Big Wind" in light of the extensive damage. Damage in Roscommon was "impossible to calculate," as all power and communication around the town was lost. In Limerick, 15 people were injured. Across County Cavan, thousands of trees were snapped or uprooted, leaving many towns temporarily cut off as roads were blocked and communications lost. Many structures sustained damage, which ranged from broken slate roofing to flattened barns. Most towns across the county were left without power and telephone service. Residents described the storm as "the worst in living memory."

Along the coast, rough seas spurred by the winds damaged docks and flooded some coastal regions. Offshore, waves reached heights of  near Arranmore. In Salthill, three marinas were damaged with forty vessels damaged or sunk. Between 11:00 a.m. and 1:00 p.m. local time, onshore winds from the storm caused the River Shannon to flow backwards and rise . Hundreds of acres of land, including potato and cabbage plots, were left several feet underwater. Many roads were submerged, making travel impossible in the area. Spray from the River Foyle reportedly travelled .

In the wake of the storm, more than 1,000 Electricity Supply Board (ESB) personnel were deployed to restore power. In some areas, locals worked together to provide others with fresh food after electricity was lost. Fire brigades were sent on patrol to quell any looting. In Galway, ESB repair crews worked through labor and supply shortages to restore power and telephone service despite recent strikes in the company. By September 23, officials in the city appealed to the Government for funding to deal with the aftermath of the storm. Uncertainty over whether some of the cost could be footed by landowners themselves resulted in disagreement over how much aid to request. Due to the severity of damage to the electrical grid, there were numerous requests made to the ESB to build underground power cables, especially in Galway.

Northern Ireland

Exceptionally strong winds from the storm buffeted parts of Northern Ireland. The winds downed tens of thousands of trees and more than 1,000 telephone lines across the region. Countless roads across Northern Ireland were blocked by debris and major rail lines had to suspend service. There was severe damage in the city of Derry where a newly built school was destroyed. Losses in the city alone amounted to £500,000 (US$1.4 million). In Lagan Valley, a brick community hall was destroyed. An estimated 200 homes and two churches in Strabane were damaged. The town's labour exchange building was severely damaged as well. In a local cemetery, many tombstones were uprooted from concrete foundations and destroyed. A newly built fire station in Clogher collapsed after its roof was blown off. Several people were injured in Belfast after a glass ceiling collapsed in a bus station and a piece of corrugated roofing blew in from a nearby building.

Six people were killed in Northern Ireland, mostly due to fallen trees: two in County Fermanagh and one each in Cookstown, Dungannon, Omagh, and elsewhere in Tyrone. The cereal crop in Northern Ireland suffered greatly due to Debbie, with half of the yield being lost. Losses from the crop were estimated at £1 million (US$2.8 million).  In the wake of the storm, military ambulances from the Royal Army Medical Corps were dispatched to parts of West Tyrone. Power repair crews were dispatched for nearly a week repairing downed wires across Northern Ireland. Many public authorities paid tribute to the workers for their tireless work.

Elsewhere 
After passing through Ireland, the storm brought strong winds and heavy rain to parts of Scotland and Wales, resulting in some damage and flooding in the region. On the coast of Lancashire and the Isle of Man, sand storms were reported.

Unsettled weather in the Cape Verde Islands brought about by Tropical Storm Debbie was blamed for a plane crash on September 6 that killed 60 people. Strong winds were also reported from the Bay of Biscay to locations in northern Norway.

References

See also

Tropical cyclone effects in Europe
Hurricane Charley (1986)
Hurricane Lili (1996)
Hurricane Ophelia (2017)

Notes

External links
The National Hurricane Center's storm wallets archive for Hurricane Debbie

1961 Atlantic hurricane season
1961 in Ireland
Debbie (1961)
Hurricanes in Cape Verde
Hurricanes in Europe
Weather events in Ireland
Weather events in the United Kingdom
1961 disasters in the United Kingdom
Hurricanes in the Azores
September 1961 events in Europe
1961 disasters in Ireland
Category 1 Atlantic hurricanes
September 1961 events in the United Kingdom